Chaker Bazar (also Romanized as Chāker Bāzār; also known as Shāker Bāzār) is a village in Polan Rural District, Polan District, Chabahar County, Sistan and Baluchestan Province, Iran. At the 2006 census, its population was 258, in 48 families.

References 

Populated places in Chabahar County